John Galvin (15 May 1907 – 11 October 1963) was an Irish Fianna Fáil politician. He was an unsuccessful candidate for the Cork Borough constituency at the 1954 general election. He was elected to Dáil Éireann as a Fianna Fáil Teachta Dála (TD) for Cork Borough at the August 1956 by-election caused by the death of Patrick McGrath of Fianna Fáil. He was re-elected at the 1957 and 1961 general elections. He died in office in 1963, and the February 1964 by-election held for his seat was won by his widow Sheila Galvin.

See also
Families in the Oireachtas

References

1907 births
1963 deaths
Fianna Fáil TDs
Members of the 15th Dáil
Members of the 16th Dáil
Members of the 17th Dáil
Politicians from County Cork
Spouses of Irish politicians